Brephodrillia ella is a species of sea snail, a marine gastropod mollusk in the family Drilliidae.

Description

Distribution
This species occurs in the Pacific Ocean between Nicaragua and Panama.

References

 Tucker, J.K. 2004. Catalog of Recent and fossil turrids (Mollusca: Gastropoda). Zootaxa 682: 1–1295

External links
 

ella